Dániel Kóger (born November 10, 1989) is a Hungarian professional ice hockey player. He is currently playing with Fehérvár AV19 in the Austrian Hockey League (EBEL).

Playing career
After spending four years enduring a journeyman career in North American minor leagues, the American Hockey League and the ECHL, Kóger opted to make a return to Hungarian club, Alba Volán Székesfehérvár as a free agent, on a one-year contract on July 3, 2014.

Kóger competed at the 2009 Men's World Ice Hockey Championships as a member of the Hungary men's national ice hockey team.

Career statistics

Regular season and playoffs

References

External links

1989 births
Living people
Fehérvár AV19 players
Bakersfield Condors (1998–2015) players
Cincinnati Cyclones (ECHL) players
Elmira Jackals (ECHL) players
Florida Everblades players
Hershey Bears players
Hungarian ice hockey right wingers
Laredo Bucks players
Milwaukee Admirals players
Providence Bruins players
St. John's IceCaps players
EC Red Bull Salzburg players
South Carolina Stingrays players
Toledo Walleye players